Rosa Ludmilla Assing (22 February 1821 in Hamburg – 25 March 1880 in Florence) was a German writer, who also wrote under the pseudonyms Achim Lothar and Talora.

Life
Ludmilla Assing was the second daughter of author Rosa Maria Varnhagen and David Assur Assing, a physician from Königsberg. Her elder sister Ottilie Assing was a feminist author and abolitionist activist.

David Assing converted to Lutheranism so he could marry Ludmilla's mother, Rosa Maria Assing — although, for the sake of mutuality, the family moved into a Jewish neighbourhood where Assing would feel more comfortable.

Ludmilla's parents were liberal intellectuals and held cultural salons attended by authors and thinkers including Heinrich Heine, Friedrich Hebbel, Karl Gutzkow and poets of the Young Germany (Junges Deutschland) movement. 

After the death of her parents she moved to Berlin to live with her uncle, author Karl August Varnhagen von Ense, Ludmilla's mother's younger brother. As well as conversing about politics, she made accomplished pastel portraits of Varnhagen's visitors including Gottfried Keller, who she corresponded with for many years. Her sister Ottilie left home after an argument and later emigrated to the US. 

 

On her uncle's death in 1858 Ludmilla inherited his collection of documents. She prepared the scandalous letters of Alexander von Humboldt for publication in 1869 and Varnhagen's diaries which appeared in print from 1862 to 1870 in 14 volumes. This brought her worldwide fame but also into conflict with the authorities. Otto von Bismarck ordered that the diaries covering the year 1848 be seized, and forbade their publisher Brockhaus from distributing them. Assing fled to Florence in Italy and continued her activities as an author and editor. She joined the left wing of the Risorgimento movement to unify Italy and wrote about politics in Italian and German for periodicals in each country as well as translating Italian texts into German. 

Ludmilla Assing's friends included Ferdinand Lassalle, Georg and Emma Herwegh, Hedwig Dohm and Hermann, Fürst von Pückler-Muskau. After Pückler's death she wrote his biography and prepared his unpublished literary works for print.

Assing died of meningitis in a Florence hospital in 1880.

Private life
She married 25 year old Italian Bersaglieri lieutenant Cino Grimelli in 1874 leading her to be credited as Ludmilla Assing-Grimelli in later published works. The marriage was deemed scandalous and was dissolved after one year.  Grimelli committed suicide in 1878.

References

External links
 

1821 births
1880 deaths
19th-century German writers
19th-century German women writers
German people of Jewish descent
Writers from Hamburg
Varnhagen family